David Krane is the CEO and managing partner at GV, where he was responsible for investments in Uber, Nest Labs, HomeAway, Juicero and Blue Bottle Coffee. He was Google employee #84.

Krane received his Bachelor of Arts in journalism from Indiana University Bloomington. He currently serves on the Dean's advisory board for the IU School of Informatics and Computer Science. David is also a trustee of San Francisco's Contemporary Jewish Museum of Art.

References 

Google people
Indiana University Bloomington alumni
Living people
Year of birth missing (living people)